Baroa vatala is a moth of the subfamily Arctiinae first described by Swinhoe in 1894. It is found in China (Hong Kong, Jiangxi, Guangdong, Guangxi, Yunnan, Hubei, Hunan), Nepal, Bhutan and India (Assam, Sikkim).

References

Arctiini
Moths described in 1894